Andrew Hafitz is an American film editor who graduated from Yale University in 1984.

Filmography
Naz & Maalik (2015)
Damsels in Distress (2012)
Chapter 27 (2007)
Tonight at Noon (2006)
Keane (2004),
Ken Park (2002)
Bully (2001)
Reveille (2001) 
The Lifestyle (1999)
The Last Days of Disco (1998)

External links

Living people
American film editors
Place of birth missing (living people)
Year of birth missing (living people)
Yale University alumni